Woodston  may refer to:
Woodston, Cambridgeshire, part of Peterborough, England
Woodston, Kansas, USA
Woodstone Village, County Durham, England